Kåre Fossum (born 19 September 1936) is a Norwegian veterinarian.

He was hired at the Norwegian School of Veterinary Science in 1961. He started as a research assistant, then became associate professor, then professor of microbiology and immunology from 1975. He served as rector of the Norwegian School of Veterinary Science from 1989 to 1992, with assistance from prorector Knut Rønningen. From 1973 to 1975 he was a guest professor at the Department of Public Health, Pharmacology and Toxicology at the University of Nairobi, and he has also been director of the Veterinærmedisinsk senter in Tromsø. In 1995 he was hired at the National Veterinary Institute.

He is a member of Norwegian Academy of Science and Letters. In 2005 he was decorated with the King's Medal of Merit in gold.

He resides in Nordstrand, Oslo.

References

1936 births
Living people
Norwegian veterinarians
Academic staff of the Norwegian School of Veterinary Science
Rectors of the Norwegian School of Veterinary Science
Members of the Norwegian Academy of Science and Letters
Recipients of the King's Medal of Merit in gold